Andy Andreoff (born May 17, 1991) is a Canadian professional ice hockey player for the Bridgeport Islanders of the American Hockey League (AHL) while under contract to the New York Islanders of the National Hockey League (NHL). Andreoff was selected by the Los Angeles Kings in the third round (80th overall) of the 2011 NHL Entry Draft.

Early life
Andreoff was born on May 17, 1991, in Pickering, Ontario, Canada, to mother Kathy and is of Macedonian descent.

Playing career

Amateur
Growing up in Pickering, Andreoff attended Vaughn Willard Public School and played with the Ajax-Pickering minor midget Raiders while attending St. Mary Catholic Secondary School. He was drafted in the fifth round of the 2007 Ontario Hockey League (OHL) Entry Draft by the Oshawa Generals. Andreoff played five seasons of major junior hockey with the Generals, scoring 81 goals and 126 assists for 207 points, while earning 312 penalty minutes, in 281 games played.

In his first full year of major junior hockey during 2008–09, Andreoff skated in 66 games and scored 11 goals with 14 assists. The team finished fourth in its division and missed the OHL playoffs. He was ranked 168th amongst North American skaters by the NHL Central Scouting Bureau s final rankings and was not selected in the 2009 NHL Entry Draft. The following year, Andreoff experienced a breakout sophomore season in which he recorded 48 points. He credited his uptake in scoring to his coaches who told him to "be more aggressive." In spite of his efforts, the Generals once again failed to qualify for the OHL playoffs, finishing fourth in the East Division.

Andreoff topped his sophomore season during the Generals' 2010–11 campaign by recording a new career-high 33 goals and 42 assists. This garnered the attention of the Los Angeles Kings who drafted him 80th overall in the 2011 NHL Entry Draft. He had not expected to be drafted and found out while watching the draft listening for his friends' names. By the conclusion of the 2010–11 season, Andreoff earned a scholarship to attend Durham College and received the teams' Eric Lindros Top Forward Award. Prior to the beginning of the following season, Andreoff signed a three-year entry-level contract with the Kings on October 13, 2011, before being loaned back to the Generals. He was also named an assistant captain alongside Scott Valentine, Christian Thomas, and captain Boone Jenner.

Professional
Upon concluding his major junior career, Andreoff was re-assigned to the Kings' American Hockey League (AHL) affiliate, the Manchester Monarchs, for the remainder of the season on an amateur tryout agreement. After attending the Kings' 2012 training camp, he was re-assigned to the Monarch for his first full professional season. During the 2012–13 season, Andreoff recorded 13 goals with 13 assists in 69 games while collecting a team-leading 111 penalty minutes. As a result, the Monarchs finished third in the Atlantic Division but lost in the first round against the Springfield Falcons.

Prior to the 2014–15 season, Andreoff was re-signed to a new one-year contract with the Kings on July 14, 2014. After attending the Kings' training camp, he made his NHL debut on October 14 against the Edmonton Oilers. On March 17, 2015, Andreoff recorded his first career goal, which turned out to be the game winner, in a 1–0 win over the Arizona Coyotes.

On June 24, 2017, the Kings re-signed Andreoff to a two-year, $1.355 million contract worth $677,500 annually. On June 13, 2018, Andreoff was traded to the Tampa Bay Lightning in exchange of Peter Budaj. He played with their AHL affiliate, the Syracuse Crunch, for the 2018–19 season and did not feature in a game with the Lightning.

Andreoff signed a two-year, $1.5 million contract as an unrestricted free agent with the Philadelphia Flyers on July 1, 2019. On September 20, 2021, Andreoff was signed to a one-year contract by the New York Islanders. He was then placed on waivers by the Islanders on October 6, 2021.

Career statistics

References

External links

1991 births
Living people
Bridgeport Islanders players
Canadian ice hockey left wingers
Ice hockey people from Ontario
Lehigh Valley Phantoms players
Los Angeles Kings draft picks
Los Angeles Kings players
Manchester Monarchs (AHL) players
New York Islanders players
Oshawa Generals players
People from Pickering, Ontario
Philadelphia Flyers players
Syracuse Crunch players
Canadian people of Macedonian descent